Parker Glacier is a valley glacier in the Mountaineer Range of Victoria Land which drains the area just east and northeast of Mount Monteagle, and flows south to Lady Newnes Bay where it terminates in a floating glacier tongue adjacent to Andrus Point. Mapped by United States Geological Survey (USGS) from surveys and U.S. Navy air photos, 1960–64. Named by Advisory Committee on Antarctic Names (US-ACAN) for Anthony G.H. Parker, biologist at Hallett Station in 1963–64, and McMurdo Station, 1964–65 and 1966–67.

References 

Glaciers of Victoria Land
Borchgrevink Coast